The 2006 Liebherr World Team Table Tennis Championships was held in the AWD-Dome of Bremen, Germany from April 24 to May 1, 2006. It is the 48th edition to be contested.

Medal summary

Medal table

Events

Results

Men's team

Final

Place 1–12 bracket

Women's team

Final

Place 1–12 bracket

References
ITTF website
ITTF Statistics

World Table Tennis Championships
World Table Tennis Championships
World Table Tennis Championships
T
Table tennis competitions in Germany